Madates was the leader of the Uxii. He was supposedly ethnically Persian, but it is not unlikely he was Uxian and was a close relative of Darius III. He was married to the niece of the mother of Darius, Sisygambis. The idea Madates being a Persian ruling a non-Persian tribe "seems strange but has rarely received much attention from scholars." The idea comes from Diodorus and Curtius. Madates tried to fight Alexander, but the Uxians were at first reluctant. He fought and lost, but was eventually pardoned.

References 

4th-century BC Iranian people
Uxii